Women's freestyle 55 kilograms competition at the 2012 Summer Olympics in London, United Kingdom, took place on 9 August at ExCeL London.

This freestyle wrestling competition consists of a single-elimination tournament, with a repechage used to determine the winner of two bronze medals. The two finalists face off for gold and silver medals. Each wrestler who loses to one of the two finalists moves into the repechage, culminating in a pair of bronze medal matches featuring the semifinal losers each facing the remaining repechage opponent from their half of the bracket.

Each bout consists of up to three rounds, lasting two minutes apiece. The wrestler who scores more points in each round is the winner of that rounds; the bout ends when one wrestler has won two rounds (and thus the match).

Schedule
All times are British Summer Time (UTC+01:00)

Results
Legend
F — Won by fall

Final

Top half

Bottom half

Repechage

Final standing

References

Page 44

Wrestling at the 2012 Summer Olympics
Women's events at the 2012 Summer Olympics
Olym